Kull of Atlantis or Kull the Conqueror is a fictional character created by writer Robert E. Howard. The character was more introspective than Howard's subsequent creation, Conan the Barbarian, whose first appearance was in a re-write of a rejected Kull story.

His first published appearance was "The Shadow Kingdom" in Weird Tales (August, 1929). Kull was portrayed in the 1997 film Kull the Conqueror by actor Kevin Sorbo.

Fictional character biography

Life in Atlantis
Kull was born in pre-cataclysmic Atlantis c. 100,000 BC, depicted as inhabited at the time by barbarian tribes. East of Atlantis lay the ancient continent of Thuria, of which the northwest portion is divided among several civilized kingdoms. The most powerful among these was Valusia; others included Commoria, Grondar, Kamelia, Thule, and Verulia. Note that the word "Thuria" never appears in any of the Kull stories. Howard coined the term while tying Kull's world to Conan's in the 1936 essay "The Hyborian Age".

Kull was born into a tribe settled in the Tiger Valley of Atlantis. Both the valley and tribe were destroyed by a flood while Kull was still a toddler, leaving the young Kull to live as a feral child for many years. Kull was captured by the Sea-Mountain tribe and eventually adopted by them. In "Exile of Atlantis", an adolescent Kull grants a woman a quick death so that she will not be burned to death by a mob. For this selfless act, Kull is exiled from Atlantis.

Slave, pirate, outlaw, and gladiator
Kull attempted to reach Thuria, but was instead captured by Lemurian Pirates. He spent a couple of years as a galley slave before regaining his freedom during a mutiny.

He tried the life of a pirate between his late adolescence and his early twenties. His fighting skills and courage allowed him to become captain of his own ship. Soon, Kull gained a fearsome reputation for himself in the seas surrounding Atlantis and Thuria. Kull lost his ship and crew in a naval battle off the coast of Valusia, but once again survived. He settled in Valusia as an outlaw. However, his criminal career proved to be short-lived as he was soon captured by the Valusians and imprisoned in a dungeon.  His captors offered him a choice: execution or service as a gladiator. He chose the latter. After proving to be an effective combatant and gaining fame in the arenas of the capital, a number of fans helped to regain his freedom.

Soldier and king
Kull never left Valusia or returned to the life of an outlaw. Instead, he joined the Royal army as a mercenary, pursuing elevation through the ranks. In "The Curse of the Golden Skull" Kull, approaching his thirties, is recruited by King Borna of Valusia in a mission against the ambitious sorcerer Rotath of Lemuria. Kull proves to be an effective assassin.

Borna promoted Kull into the general command of his mercenary forces. Borna himself, however, had gained a reputation for his cruelty and despotism. There was discontent with Borna's rule among the nobility, leading eventually to a civil war. The mercenaries proved more loyal to Kull than any other leader, allowing him to become first the leadership in their revolt and then King. Kull killed Borna and took the throne while he was still in his early thirties. In "The Shadow Kingdom", Kull has spent six months upon the Valusian throne and faces the first conspiracy against him.

The series continued with Kull finding that gaining the crown was easier than securing it. He faces several internal and external challenges throughout the series. The conspiring of his courtiers leaves Kull almost constantly threatened with loss of life and throne. The aging King is ever more aware of the Sword of Damocles that he inherited along with the crown.

"The Mirrors of Tuzun Thune" finds Kull reaching his middle forties and becoming progressively more introspective. The former barbarian is left lost in contemplations of philosophy. At this point, the series ends. His fate is left uncertain. 

In the Conan the Barbarian story "Shadows of the Skull", it is revealed that Conan is a direct descendant of Kull.

Supporting characters
Several characters reoccur throughout the series. The best known is his trusted ally Brule the Spear-slayer, a pre-cataclysmic Pict. First Councillor Tu is a trusted administrator, but also a constant reminder of the tradition bound laws and customs of Valusia.  Ka-Nu (sometimes named Kananu), the Pictish Ambassador to Valusia and wise man, is responsible for the friendship between Kull and Brule despite the ancient enmity between Atlanteans and Picts. Kull's mortal enemy is the sorcerer Thulsa Doom.

Stories
Only three Kull stories were published before Howard committed suicide in 1936:
"The Shadow Kingdom" (first published in Weird Tales, August 1929)
"The Mirrors of Tuzun Thune" (first published in Weird Tales, September 1929)
"Kings of the Night" (first published in Weird Tales, November 1930)

Howard also wrote nine other Kull stories, which were not published until much later:
"The Altar and the Scorpion" (first published in King Kull, 1967)
"The Black City" (first published in King Kull, 1967) Also known as "The Black Abyss".
"By This Axe, I Rule" (first published in King Kull, 1967) Re-written by Howard into the Conan story "The Phoenix on the Sword".
"The Curse of the Golden Skull" (first published in The Howard Collector #9, Spring 1967)
"Delcardes' Cat" (first published in King Kull, 1967) Also known as "The Cat and the Skull".
"Exile of Atlantis" (first published in King Kull, 1967) Originally untitled, title created by Glenn Lord.
"Riders Beyond the Sunrise" (first published in Kull: The Fabulous Warrior King, 1978 although a version edited by Lin Carter was first published in King Kull, 1967) Originally untitled, title created by Lin Carter.
"The Skull of Silence" (first published in King Kull, 1967). Also known as "The Screaming Skull of Silence".
"The Striking of the Gong" (first published in the Second Book of Robert E. Howard, 1976 although a version edited by Lin Carter was first published in King Kull, 1967)
"Swords of the Purple Kingdom" (first published in King Kull, 1967)
"Wizard and Warrior" (first published in Kull: The Fabulous Warrior King, 1978 although a version edited by Lin Carter was first published in King Kull, 1967) Originally untitled, title created by Lin Carter.

Finally, Howard also wrote one Kull poem:
"The King and the Oak"

Style
Kull is Conan the Barbarian's direct literary forerunner. Conan's first story (both as a written piece and a published one), "The Phoenix on the Sword", is a rewriting of an earlier Kull story "By This Axe, I Rule".  The Conan version has a completely new backstory, less philosophy, more action, and various supernatural elements. Many passages of both stories still match word for word.

One notable difference between Kull and Conan is their respective attitudes towards women. While Conan is a notable womanizer, finding a new love interest in nearly each of his stories, Kull is repeatedly mentioned as uninterested in having any such attachment. While highly chivalrous and on several occasions helping pairs of star-crossed lovers reach a happy consummation, he is never mentioned as having himself any relationship with a woman. Nor is Kull showing any interest in marrying and founding a dynasty, as Conan does in The Hour of the Dragon, and none of Kull's wise advisors ever mentions this issue.

Adaptations

Comics

Kull has been adapted to comics by Marvel Comics with three series between 1971 and 1985. The first was drawn by Marie Severin and her brother John Severin. He also appeared several times in The Savage Sword of Conan series and other anthology books. Another graphic novel, Kull: The Vale of Shadow, was published in 1989.

In 2006, Dark Horse Comics bought the rights to use Kull. The first series, titled Kull, was based on "The Shadow Kingdom".  , three mini-series were published, Kull, Kull: The Hate Witch, and Kull: The Cat and the Skull.  Dark Horse also re-published the Marvel stories into two different Kull collections.  The Marvel color comics were collected into five volumes titled The Chronicles of Kull, and the Marvel magazine format, black and white stories were collected into two volumes titled The Savage Sword of Kull.  Additional reprints were published in Robert E. Howard's Savage Sword.

In 2017, IDW Publishing got the license and began publishing Kull Eternal, using The Mirrors of Tuzun Thune as a story foundation of Kull in a modern setting.

Collected editions

Film
The 1997 film Kull the Conqueror starred Kevin Sorbo in the title role.  The film was originally intended to be a Conan film and some elements of this remain. The story's basis and several names can be directly traced to the Conan story "The Hour of the Dragon".

The 1982 Conan the Barbarian film starring Arnold Schwarzenegger borrowed many elements from Howard's Kull stories. The main villain Thulsa Doom was from the Kull series, as was the serpent cult. Conan's early life as a slave and gladiator in the movie borrows heavily from Kull's origin story and only shares minor details with Conan's literary origins; Conan was never a slave or a gladiator in Howard's stories, and left Cimmeria on his own will.

Namesakes in other works of fiction
Kull may have been the source of the name of King Kull, a Fawcett Comics supervillain and foe of Captain Marvel, later acquired by DC Comics. This King Kull combines barbarian elements with the bizarre science-fiction elements common in Captain Marvel stories of the Golden Age of comic books.

Chronology 
In Robert E. Howard's story "Kings of the Night", a character living in the time of the Roman Empire states that a contemporary of Kull's "has been dead a hundred thousand years as we reckon time."

Copyright and trademark

The name Kull was registered as a trademark by Kull Productions in 1985. The trademark is now owned by Robert E. Howard Properties.

The Australian site of Project Gutenberg has many Robert E. Howard stories, including several Kull stories. This indicates that, in their opinion, the stories hosted on the site are free from copyright and may be used by anyone, at least under Australian law. Subsequent stories written by other authors are subject to the copyright laws of the relevant time.

References

 
Fantasy books by series
Male characters in literature
Characters in pulp fiction
Fantasy film characters
Fictional Atlanteans
Fictional gladiators
Fictional kings
Fictional mercenaries
Fictional slaves
Fictional swordfighters
Literary characters introduced in 1929
Marvel Comics Atlanteans (pre-cataclysm)
Novels adapted into comics
Robert E. Howard characters
American novels adapted into films